{
  "type": "FeatureCollection",
  "features": [
    {
      "type": "Feature",
      "properties": {},
      "geometry": {
        "type": "Point",
        "coordinates": [
          5.8385467424523085,
          35.152028137913895
        ]
      }
    }
  ]
}

Ain Zaatout is the administrative name of a mountainous village in north east Algeria, called Ah Frah in the local Shawi dialect, and Beni Farah (sometimes spelled Beni Ferah) in Arabic.

It is located at 35.14° North, 5.83° East, at the southern edge of the Saharan Atlas between the provinces of Batna and Biskra. The region is largely rocky with an average altitude of more than 900 metres (2,953 feet) above sea level.

Ain Zaatout has an estimated population of around 5,000 composed of Farhi people, Muslim Berbers speaking a distinctive variant of the Shawi dialect used in the Aurès.

References

External links
Ain Zaatout in Google Pages

Populated places in Biskra Province